The European Tour 2013/2014 – Event 8 (also known as the 2014 Gdynia Open) was a professional minor-ranking snooker tournament that took place between 6–9 February 2014 at the Gdynia Sports Arena in Gdynia, Poland.

Neil Robertson was the defending champion, but he lost 3–4 against Alan McManus in the last 64.

Shaun Murphy won in the final 4–1 against Fergal O'Brien. This was Murphy's first title since the 2011 Brazil Masters 29 months earlier. Murphy also made the 104th official maximum break during his last 16 match against Jamie Jones. This was Murphy's third official 147 break, and the seventh in the 2013/2014 season.

Prize fund and ranking points 
The breakdown of prize money and ranking points of the event is shown below:

1 Only professional players can earn ranking points.

Main draw

Preliminary rounds

Round 1
Best of 7 frames

Round 2
Best of 7 frames

Round 3
Best of 7 frames

Main rounds

Top half

Section 1

Section 2

Section 3

Section 4

Bottom half

Section 5

Section 6

Section 7

Section 8

Finals

Century breaks

 147, 138, 136, 128, 103  Shaun Murphy
 138  Liu Chuang
 137  Steve Davis
 136, 133  Alfie Burden
 136, 120, 107  Martin Gould
 133, 111, 106, 103  Sam Baird
 129, 100  Mark King
 127  Gareth Allen
 126  Peter Ebdon
 125, 109  Alan McManus
 123  Rod Lawler
 121, 100  Mark Davis
 118  Marcus Campbell
 113  Fergal O'Brien

 113  Zhang Anda
 112, 100  Neil Robertson
 110  Mark Selby
 108  Stephen Maguire
 106  Chris Norbury
 106  Matthew Selt
 106  Kurt Maflin
 105  Judd Trump
 104  Jak Jones
 103  Tian Pengfei
 102  Ken Doherty
 101  David Grace
 100  Ian Burns
 100  Dominic Dale

References

External links
  
 2014 Gdynia Open in Poland – Pictures by Iza Morska & Mikołaj Ochman at Facebook

2014
ET8
2014 in Polish sport